Freeburg is a village in Osage County, Missouri, United States. The population was 409 at the 2020 census. It is part of the Jefferson City, Missouri Metropolitan Statistical Area.

History
Settled by Germans in the 1850s, Freeburg was platted in 1903 and named after the German city of Freiburg, soon after the railroad was extended to that point.

Geography
Freeburg is located at  (38.317387, -91.921356).

Demographics

2010 census
As of the census of 2010, there were 437 people, 199 households, and 123 families residing in the village. The racial makeup of the village was 98.9% White, 0.2% Asian, 0.5% Pacific Islander, and 0.5% from two or more races. Hispanic or Latino of any race were 0.7% of the population.

There were 199 households, of which 25.1% had children under the age of 18 living with them, 47.7% were married couples living together, 10.1% had a female householder with no husband present, 4.0% had a male householder with no wife present, and 38.2% were non-families. 33.7% of all households were made up of individuals, and 13.1% had someone living alone who was 65 years of age or older. The average household size was 2.20 and the average family size was 2.80.

The median age in the village was 40.6 years. 21.3% of residents were under the age of 18; 8.6% were between the ages of 18 and 24; 24.9% were from 25 to 44; 25.9% were from 45 to 64; and 19.2% were 65 years of age or older. The gender makeup of the village was 50.8% male and 49.2% female.

2000 census
As of the census of 2000, there were 423 people, 181 households, and 114 families residing in the village. The population density was 513.1 people per square mile (199.2/km). There were 205 housing units at an average density of 248.7 per square mile (96.5/km). The racial makeup of the village was 100.00% White. Hispanic or Latino of any race were 0.71% of the population.

There were 181 households, out of which 30.9% had children under the age of 18 living with them, 45.9% were married couples living together, 11.6% had a female householder with no husband present, and 37.0% were non-families. 33.7% of all households were made up of individuals, and 16.0% had someone living alone who was 65 years of age or older. The average household size was 2.34 and the average family size was 2.96.

In the city the population was spread out, with 23.2% under the age of 18, 13.5% from 18 to 24, 26.2% from 25 to 44, 21.0% from 45 to 64, and 16.1% who were 65 years of age or older. The median age was 34 years. For every 100 females, there were 98.6 males. For every 100 females age 18 and over, there were 101.9 males.

The median income for a household in the village was $31,429, and the median income for a family was $40,156. Males had a median income of $22,000 versus $19,792 for females. The per capita income for the village was $20,071. About 4.8% of families and 9.2% of the population were below the poverty line, including 11.9% of those under age 18 and 12.1% of those age 65 or over.

Climate

The climate in this area is characterized by hot, humid summers and generally cool winters.  According to the Köppen Climate Classification system, Freeburg has a humid subtropical climate, abbreviated "Cfa" on climate maps.

See also 
 Freeburg Tunnel

References

Villages in Osage County, Missouri
Jefferson City metropolitan area
Villages in Missouri